Dahan (English: The Burn) is a 1985 Bangladeshi film starring Bulbul Ahmed, Bobita, Humayun Faridi and Asaduzzaman Nur. It bagged National Film Awards in 3 and Bachsas Awards in record 10 categories that year.

Faridi played the protagonist in the film.

Cast 
 Bobita
 Bulbul Ahmed
 Humayun Faridi
 Dolly Anowar
 Abul Khayer
 Fakhrul Hasan Boiragi

Awards 
Bachsas Awards
Best Actor - Humayun Faridi
Best Actress - Bobita
Best Screenplay - Sheikh Niamat Ali
Best Director - Sheikh Niamat Ali
Best Writer - Sheikh Niamat Ali
Best Supporting Actor - Asaduzzaman Nur
Best Supporting Actress - Sharmili Ahmed
Best Editing - Saidul Anam Tutul
Best Music Direction - Anamul Haque
Best Art Direction - Masuk Helal

References

1985 films
Bengali-language Bangladeshi films
1980s Bengali-language films